U.F.Orb is the second studio album by English electronic music group The Orb. It was released on 6 July 1992 as their last work with record label Big Life. Upon its release, the album reached No. 1 on the UK Albums Chart. The music database AllMusic described it as "the commercial and artistic peak of the ambient-house movement."

Background 
Orb member Kris Weston integrated his technical and creative expertise with Alex Paterson's Eno-influenced ambience on U.F.Orb, creating "drum and bass rhythms" with "velvet keyboards" and "rippling synth lines".  U.F.Orb reached number one on the UK Albums Chart to the shock of critics, who were surprised that fans had embraced what journalists considered to be progressive rock.  Heavily influenced by The Orb and U.F.Orb in particular, many trip hop groups sprang up emulating The Orb's "chill-out blueprint".  U.F.Orb expresses The Orb's fascination with alien life with its bizarre sound samples and in the album's title itself.  The album's single, "Blue Room", is itself a reference to the supposed Blue Room of Wright-Patterson Air Force Base, which was investigated as a possible UFO evidence-holding room.

"Blue Room", a near 17-minute piece, features bass playing by Jah Wobble and guitar by coproducer Steve Hillage. The full version of the song is 40 minutes and was released as a single. The initial UK vinyl release featured a limited edition which came in a sealed blue heavy PVC cover and featured two art prints and a bonus 12-inch of the soundtrack to the film The Orb's Adventures Beyond the Ultraworld: Patterns and Textures.

On 1 October 2007, the album was reissued on two CDs as part of Universal Music's "Collector's Series". All the tracks were remastered, and the release coincided with the 15th anniversary of the album's release. The second CD includes remixes from the singles released around the period of the original album.

Track listing

Original release

1992 US double CD edition

15th anniversary edition

References

External links

The Orb albums
1992 albums
Albums produced by Steve Hillage
albums produced by Youth (musician)
Albums with cover art by The Designers Republic
Ambient house albums